The Jutland Division (Jyske Divisionskommando) was a mechanized infantry formation of the Danish Army during the Cold War. It was formed during 1951-1952 as 3rd Division from assets of the III Military Region and the division headquarters was initially located in Aabenraa. As initially formed, the division had only one active brigade (1st Brigade) and two reserve brigades (the 2nd and 3rd Brigades). The division changed its name to "Jutland Division" in 1961. In 1975, the division headquarters was moved to Fredericia and the 2nd and 3rd Brigades received full equipment sets. By 1979, each brigade was made up of two mechanized infantry battalion, a tank battalion, a self-propelled artillery battalion, and an armored reconnaissance squadron (company). In 1981 the three armored reconnaissance squadron was merged into V/JDR Reconnaissance Battalion.

In the event of war with the Soviet Union, the division would have defended Jutland against Soviet thrusts intended to sever Denmark from the rest of NATO. The division was part of the LANDJUT command and ultimately subordinated to NATO's AFNORTH command. With the end of the Cold War, the Danish Army reorganized, and the Jutland Division transformed into the Danish Division on January 1, 1997.

Units
The division in the 1980s before it changed to Danish Division 1 January 1997.

Jutland Division (HQ Fredericia)  
 3rd Signal Battalion (support and run Division HQ)
 1st Jyske Brigade (HQ Fredericia)
1st Staff Company/KJFR,
I/FLR MechInfantry Battalion
II/PLR MechInfantry Battalion
I/JDR Armoured Battalion
6th Artillery Battalion/NJAR (Armoured/Selfpropelled)
1st Armoured Engineer Company
7th Logistic Battalion
1st MP detachment
 2nd Jyske Brigade (HQ Skive)
2nd Staff Company/NJAR
I/DRLR MechInfantry Battalion
II/DRLR MechInfantry Battalion
II/JDR Armoured Battalion
3rd Artillery Battalion/NJAR (Armoured/Selfpropelled)
2nd Armoured Engineer Company
5th Logistic Battalion
2nd MP detachment
 3rd Jyske Brigade (HQ Haderslev)
3rd Staff Company/SLFR
I/PLR MechInfantry Battalion
I/KJFR MechInfantry Battalion
III/JDR Armoured Battalion
7th Artillery Battalion/SJAR (Armoured/Selfpropelled)
3rd Armoured Engineer Company
4th Logistic Battalion
3rd MP detachment
 V/JDR Reconnaissance Battalion (Armoured)
 VI/JDR Anti-tank Battalion
 IV/FLR Motorized infantry Battalion 
 Patrol Company/DRLR (Long Range/Light Reconnaissance)
 Division Artillery (HQ Skive)
Staff&Target-Acquisition Battery/NJAR
23rd Artillery Battalions/NJAR (towed)
24th Artillery Battalions/SJAR (towed)
18th Heavy Battery/NJAR (Towed)
19th Heavy Battery/NJAR (Towed)
 14th Anti-aircraft rocket Battalion/SJAR
 3rd Engineering Battalion
 3rd Electronic Warfare Company
 3rd Logistic Support Battalion
 10th Supply Battalion
 Transport Company (Heavy transport)
 2nd Military Police Company

Names

References

 
 John Keegan, World Armies, New York: Facts on File, 1979, 
 www.artilleriet.dk

Army units and formations of Denmark